Mavroudis Bougaidis (born 1 June 1993) is a Greek professional footballer who plays as a centre-back for Polish I liga club Chrobry Głogów.

Club career

Early years
Aris academies found a talented defender and the club signed with him a contract for two years. Many clubs in Greece were interested in signing Bougaidis, as he was very good with the youth team of Aris and with the Greece U19 team, too. Four clubs from Europe approached him, but he chose to play for AEK Athens.

AEK Athens
On 16 May 2011 Mavroudis Bougaidis signed a 3-year deal with Greek giants AEK Athens. Mavroudis Bougaidis made his Europa League debut against Anderlecht as a substitution. Bougaidis also played against Sturm Graz in the Europa League and impressed in Greek Super League matches at the end of 2011–12 season. In July 2012 AEK Athens rejected a €1.1m bid for Bougaidis from Everton F.C. For the 2012–13 season Bougaidis achieved 14 appierances for the Greek Superleague in a disappointing season for AEK Athens as it failed to stay in the first division of the league.

Granada CF
On 30 July 2013 Bougaidis signed a 3 years deal with La Liga team Granada CF. Initially expected to join Hércules CF on loan, the deal later collapsed and he was assigned to B-team in Segunda División B. On 1 January 2014 Bougaidis was loaned to Aris Thessaloniki F.C., his first professional team until the end of the 2013–14 season. On 4 July 2014 Bougaidis was loaned to Lechia Gdańsk for the season 2014/15 playing in Polish Ekstraklasa. He made his debut on 14 September 2014 against GKS Bełchatów (1-1).

Return to Greece
In summer 2015, after playing in Spain and Poland, Bougaidis returned to Greece to play for Panthrakikos. In January 2017, he signed a six months contract with Kissamikos.

GAIS
On 5 August 2017, Bougaidis signed a one-year and a half contract with Swedish Superettan club GAIS, for an undisclosed fee. On 4 November, he scored his first goal with the club came as a substitute in a 3–0 home win game against Varberg. He left the club again at the end of the 2017 season.

Podbeskidzie Bielsko-Biała
Bougaidis signed for Polish club Podbeskidzie Bielsko-Biała on 23 January 2018. On 17 March, he scored his first goal with the club came in a 2–0 away win game against Ruch Chorzów.

PAO Koufalia
Ahead of the 2019–20 season, Bougaidis returned to Greece and joined PAO Koufalia on 20 September 2019.

Chrobry Głogów
On 26 January 2021, Bougaidis signed a year-and-a-half contract with Polish club Chrobry Głogów.

International career
Mavroudis Bougaidis has 20 appearances for Greece U-19 National team with 4 goals. On 15 July 2012, he participated in the Final of Euro Under 19 against Spain in a 1–0 defeat. He played the whole match as a central defender next to his good friend Dimitris Kourbelis. In June 2013 Bougaidis participated on the World Cup U20 with Greece eliminating in the round of 16.

References

External links

Onsports.gr Profile

1993 births
Living people
People from Thessaloniki (regional unit)
Greek footballers
Greek expatriate footballers
Greece youth international footballers
Greece under-21 international footballers
Association football defenders
Aris Thessaloniki F.C. players
AEK Athens F.C. players
Club Recreativo Granada players
Lechia Gdańsk players
Lechia Gdańsk II players
Panthrakikos F.C. players
GAIS players
Podbeskidzie Bielsko-Biała players
Super League Greece players
Ekstraklasa players
I liga players
Superettan players
Expatriate footballers in Spain
Expatriate footballers in Poland
Expatriate footballers in Sweden
Footballers from Central Macedonia